A valkyrie is a figure in Norse mythology.

Valkyrie, and related words such as Valkyria and Walküre, may also refer to:

 Operation Valkyrie, WWII German Army plot to assassinate Hitler 
 Dome F, also called "Valkyrie Dome", a Japanese Antarctic base
 .224 Valkyrie, a rifle cartridge

Arts and media

Fictional characters
 Valkyrie Cain, in Skulduggery Pleasant
 Valkyrie (Marvel Comics), a superhero
 In UFO Ultramaiden Valkyrie
 An organization in Strong Female Protagonist
 In Valkyrie no Bōken 
 In Tom Clancy's Rainbow Six Siege
 In Clash of Clans
 In Apex Legends
 Kamen Rider Valkyrie, in Kamen Rider Zero-One

Fictional vehicles and weapons
 Valkyrie Missile Frigate, in the game StarCraft
 Valkyrie SSTO-TAV-37 B-class, a shuttlecraft from the film Avatar
 A missile in Call of Duty: Black Ops
 A weapon in Destiny 2
 An aircraft carrier in the game Battlefield 4
 VF-1 Valkyrie, an aircraft in the Macross series
 An aircraft in Captain America: The First Avenger

Film and television
 "The Valkyrie", an episode of Highlander: The Series (season 5)
 Valkyrie Drive, a TV series and game
 Stauffenberg (film), a 2004 German film known as Operation Valkyrie in international release 
 Valkyrie (film), 2008, based on Operation Valkyrie
 The Valkyrie Legacy, a 2008 documentary film by Kevin Burns about Operation Valkyrie

Games
 Eve: Valkyrie, a VR game in development
 Valkyria Chronicles, a video game series
 Valkyrie Profile, a game series

Music
 The Valkyrie (Die Walküre), an opera by Richard Wagner
 Valkyrie (album)
 Valkyrie (American band)
 Valkyrie (New Zealand band)
 "Valkyrie", a 2019 song by Oneus
 Valkyrien, a ballet by Hartmann
 "Valkyries", a song by Amberian Dawn on the 2008 album River of Tuoni
 "Valkyries", a song by Blind Guardian on the 2010 album At the Edge of Time
 Valkyrja (album), by Týr, 2-13

Written media
 Valkyrie (magazine)

Transportation

Aerospace
 ASL Valkyrie, an aeroplane series
 Cobalt Co50 Valkyrie, experimental aircraft
 Kratos XQ-58 Valkyrie, an unmanned aircraft
 North American XB-70 Valkyrie, a bomber aircraft
 Project Valkyrie, a theoretical spacecraft
 Valkiri, a South African rocket launcher

Automotive
 Honda Valkyrie, a motorcycle range
 Aston Martin Valkyrie, a supercar

Sea
 Valkyrie II, 1893, UK, in America's Cup
 Valkyrie III, 1895, UK, in America's Cup
 Walküre, a ship sunk in the 1914 Bombardment of Papeete

Sports
 Minnesota Valkyrie, a US football team
 Taya Valkyrie, a Canadian wrestler
 Valkyrie (mixed martial arts), Japan
 Valkyrie, a golf driver by Innova Discs
 York Valkyrie, am English women's rugby league team

See also

 Valkyria (disambiguation)
 Valkyrae (Rachel Hofstetter, born 1992), American live streamer
 Ride of the Valkyries (disambiguation)
 Valkyrien (disambiguation)